The Milan Metro is the rapid transit/metro system serving Milan, Italy. The system has a daily ridership of over one million.

The metro network is connected to the Milan suburban railway service through several stations. Metro lines are identified by the letter "M", while suburban line numbers are preceded by the letter "S".

Stations

References

Metro
Milan
Milan
Metro